Tamba may refer to:

People
 a traditional name among the Kono people of Sierra Leone, West Africa
 Tamba Hali (born 1983), Liberia-born American football player
, Japanese sport wrestler
 Tetsurō Tamba (1922–2006), Japanese actor

Places
 Tanba Province, a former province in Japan
 Tamba, Hyōgo, Hyōgo Prefecture, Japan
 Tamba, Kyoto, Kyoto Prefecture, Japan
 Tamba, Estonia, Varbla Parish, Pärnu County, Estonia
 Tamba Kheri, Rajasthan, India

Other
 Tamba (moth), a genus of moths in the family Erebidae
 Tamba (train), a limited express train service operated by West Japan Railway Company
 Tamba ware, a type of Japanese pottery
 Tamba, a puppet on Tikkabilla, a UK children's TV show
 A traditional sarong-like garment worn by Punjabi Bhangra dancers

See also
 Tambas language, a West Chadic language spoken in Plateau State, Nigeria

Japanese-language surnames